Omega Aerial Refueling Services is a company that provides aerial refueling services for military customers.

History
Omega developed the first commercial aerial refueling aircraft in 1999, and has provided aerial refueling services under contract to the United States Navy since 2001. The company has also been engaged to support Royal Australian Air Force training exercises due to delays in delivery of KC-30A tankers. In addition, Omega Air Refueling states it has been contracted to support deployments by the Royal Air Force and the Royal Canadian Air Force.

In October 2011, the company took delivery of three additional Boeing 707-338Cs from the Royal Australian Air Force.

On April 22, 2015, one of Omega's KC-707s refuelled a Northrop Grumman X-47B. The US Navy told the media this was the first time an unmanned aerial vehicle had been refuelled in flight.

In November 2019, it was announced that two KDC-10 Tankers from the Royal Netherlands Air Force would be acquired and as such additional capacity would be added, including 'boom capability' in addition to the existing 'hose and drogue' of the existing fleet. The aircraft were bought in 1995 by the RNLAF from Martinair as civilian DC-10 passenger airliners. The planes were converted to tanker aircraft. Because the planes were getting older and the RNLAF bought two A330 MRTT from Airbus, they sold their older tankers to Omega Air Refueling.

The first of the two tankers that were sold, T-264 Prins Bernard, departed on Monday, November 4, 2019, from Eindhoven Air Base in the Netherlands.

Fleet

, Omega Aerial Refueling Services operates the following aircraft:

They are currently converting one 707-320 (reg. N707GF), a former Romanian VIP transport and two DC 10-30/40s (regs. N264DE and N235UL), former Royal Netherlands Air Force tankers.

Accidents and incidents
On May 18, 2011, Omega Aerial Refueling Services Flight 70, a KC-707 tanker registered as N707AR, was destroyed after it crashed on takeoff from Naval Base Ventura County in California. All three crew members survived.

References

External links

Air refueling
Defense companies of the United States